Vasujyeshtha or Sujyeshtha was the third king of the Shunga Dynasty of Northern India. His reign is not well documented, thus little is known about him. He is credited with successfully completing his grandfather's Ashvamedha and for defeating forces of the Indo-Greek Kingdom along the banks of the Sindhu River. His achievements are mentioned briefly in the "Malavikagnimitra", which was composed during the later Gupta era by Kalidasa.

References

Shunga Empire
131 BC deaths
2nd-century BC Indian monarchs
Year of birth unknown